Copper fist is an N-terminal domain involved in copper-dependent DNA binding. It is named for its resemblance to a fist.

It can be found in some fungal transcription factors. These proteins activate the transcription of the metallothionein gene in response to copper. Metallothionein maintains copper levels in yeast. The copper fist domain is similar in structure to metallothionein itself, and on copper binding undergoes a large conformational change, which allows DNA binding.

External links
Copper fist definition

References
 

Protein domains